Symphonische Dichtungen aus Persien (Symphonic Poems from Persia) is the name of 3 gramophone records recorded with Nuremberg Symphony Orchestra in 1980 conducted by Ali Rahbari.  Including works of the Persian (Iranian) contemporary composers:

Hossein Dehlavi – Suite of Bijan & Manijeh (Based on National Epic of Persia Ferdowsi's 'Shahnameh')
Aminollah Hossein – Shahrzad
Mohammad Taghi Massoudieh – Movement Symphonic
Houshang Ostovar – Iranian Suite
Ahmad Pejman – Dance, Rhapsodie, Ballete
Ali Rahbari – Persian Mystic on G

The records were released as a compact disc by Colosseum Company in Germany in 2005.

References
 Symphonic Poems from Persia" Released in Germany (Payvand News)
 Symphonische Dichtungen aus Persien (World Cat)

1980 albums
1980s classical albums
Persian symphonies